John Lawton is a television producer/director and author of historical/crime/espionage novels set primarily in Britain during World War II and the Cold War.

Biography
Lawton worked briefly in London publishing prior to becoming, by the mid-1980s, a documentary television producer at the newly created Channel 4. In 1993 he settled in New York, and in 1995 won a WH Smith Award for his third book Black Out. He went back into television in England in 1997, and by 1999 had dropped off the TV and books map completely. He returned in 2001 with Riptide (American title: Bluffing Mr. Churchill), which was snapped up by Columbia Pictures. For most of the 21st century, so far, he has tended to be elusive and itinerant, residing in England, the United States and Italy. He appeared in New York, in 2008, with a reading in Greenwich Village.[2] Earlier the same year he was named in the Daily Telegraph (London) as one of "50 Crime Writers To Read Before You Die". In October 2010 he read in Ottawa, Toronto, Portland and Seattle, ending up at the Mysterious Book Store in Tribeca, and later that year was named in the New York Times Reviews "Pick of the Year" for his novel A Lily of the Field.

Many of the biography pages within Lawton's books have a decidedly tongue-in-cheek bent, with hobbies listed as the "cultivation of the onion and obscure varieties of potato", or "growing leeks". Those close to him would stress that such descriptions are meant quite seriously. His author bio notes that "since 2000 he has lived in the high, wet hills of Derbyshire England, with frequent excursions into the high, dry hills of Arizona and Italy."

Bibliography

Frederick Troy novels
The novels in the Frederick Troy series share the eponymous protagonist Frederick (he doesn't like any form of his given name, preferring to be addressed by his surname) Troy, the younger son of a Russian immigrant father who has become a wealthy newspaper publisher and baronet. Defying class and family expectations, the independently wealthy Troy joins Scotland Yard, becoming an investigator on the "murder squad". The rights to the fourth novel in the series (Riptide) were purchased by Columbia Pictures several years ago. The rest have been optioned repeatedly, in both England and the US, but, so far, nothing has ever made it to the screen, large or small.

The series, in published order:

 Black Out (1995), 
The story begins during the last stages of the London Blitz in 1944. Sergent Troy is assigned to find out who's murdering German scientists who've been secretly smuggled out of Germany and into Britain. Later, Troy tracks his suspect to Berlin in 1948, during the Berlin Blockade. Along the way, he tangles with British and American spy agencies, a Russian spy and a British femme fatale.
 Old Flames (1996), 
 Chief Inspector Troy, because he speaks Russian, is assigned to guard Russian Secretary-General Nikita Khrushchev, during his 1956 visit to Britain. Along with these duties, Troy investigates the death of an ex-navy diver during a curiously botched spy mission.
 A Little White Death (1998), 
The third Troy novel uses the historical events of the Profumo affair and the Kim Philby spy scandal of the early 1960s as a jumping-off point for a fictionalized version in which Troy, now risen to Commander in Scotland Yard, discovers that an apparent suicide (of the fictional Stephen Ward-analog character) was really a murder. A second apparent suicide thickens the plot. Most of the historical characters get fictional equivalents, a few appear as themselves, and Christine Keeler becomes a pair of sisters. In the closing Historical Note, however, Lawton explains his historical inspirations and cautions that "This is not a roman à clef." Concurrent with the scandal/spy/murder plot, Lawton interleaves some cultural history on the beginnings of 'swinging London'. The novel's title is a double entendre, referring both to the pills used in the second suspicious suicide and to Troy's life-and-career-threatening battle against tuberculosis.
 Riptide (2001),  (Published in the United States (2004) as Bluffing Mr. Churchill)
Lawton backtracks chronologically to the early days of World War II, before Black Out. The Americans, not yet in the war, send Calvin M. Cormack to London to find an agent fled from Germany and bring him in for debriefing. He is paired with MI5 officer Walter Stilton and takes Stilton's daughter Kitty as a lover, who is also seeing her ex boyfriend Sergeant Troy of Scotland Yard.  When Stilton is killed, Cal joins with Troy to investigate the trail of murders and learn why the agent won't come in.
 Blue Rondo (2005) (Published in the United States as Flesh Wounds)
This book opens at almost exactly the same point as Black Out, and then skips ten years beyond the end of Black Out to pick up the lives of characters who are only children in the first novel. In 1959 two of them have grown up to be East End gangsters trying to move into the West End, and one has become a policeman working with Chief Superintendent Frederick Troy. There are some similarities to the historical story of the three Kray brothers, but Blue Rondo is set in a very different era and the author has, on occasion, warned against making too much of such analogy.
 Second Violin (2007), 
Another "prequel" to Black Out, this time back to 1938. The main protagonist this time is Frederick Troy's older brother Rod, working as a reporter for his father's newspaper. Rod travels to Vienna, just in time to witness Kristallnacht. Returning to Britain, he is sent to an internment camp on the Isle of Man because of his Austrian birth and failure to pursue naturalisation. During the Battle of Britain, he is freed to become a fighter pilot. Meanwhile, brother Sergeant Troy investigates the murders of several East End rabbis. The parallel stories eventually converge at the final denouement.
 A Lily of the Field (2010), 
This novel tells two linked stories, differing in tone and structure, but heading to the same conclusion. The first part, "Audacity", is set in the years 1934–46 in Europe, and has only the briefest mention of Frederick Troy. It is, essentially, the back-story to all that follows. The second part, "Austerity", set in London in 1948, is a more familiar Inspector Troy murder investigation, that, almost inevitably, spills over into Cold War espionage.
 Friends and Traitors (2017), 
It is 1958. Chief Superintendent Frederick Troy of Scotland Yard, newly promoted after good service during Nikita Khrushchev’s visit to Britain, is visiting Europe as part of a trip to celebrate his elder brother's birthday. After a concert in Vienna, he is approached by an old friend whom he has not seen for years—Guy Burgess, a spy for the Soviets, who says something extraordinary: "I want to come home". Troy dumps the problem on MI5 who send an agent to debrief Burgess—but the agent is gunned down only yards from the embassy, and after that, the whole plan unravels with alarming speed, and Troy finds himself a suspect. As he fights to prove his innocence, Troy finds that Burgess is not the only ghost who returns to haunt him.

The series in plot-chronological order:
Second Violin
Riptide / Bluffing Mr. Churchill
Black Out
A Lily of the Field
Old Flames
Friends and Traitors
Blue Rondo / Flesh Wounds
A Little White Death

Joe Wilderness novels
 Then We Take Berlin (2013) 
 The Unfortunate Englishman (2016) 
 Hammer to Fall (2020)

Other fiction
 Sweet Sunday (2002) 
 East of Suez, West of Charing Cross Road (included in Agents of Treachery anthology, Otto Penzler editor, 2010) . A comedy set during the Profumo affair when a junior army officer is mistaken for someone important and blackmailed.
 Bentinck's Agent (2013). Kindle Single.

Non-fiction
1963 Five Hundred Days: History As Melodrama (1992)

Television
A Walk up 5th Avenue
Christians in Palestine
Free and Fair
25th Anniversary of the Mersey Poets (with Brian Patten)
Green Thoughts (with Gore Vidal)
O Superman (with Harold Pinter)

References

External links 
The Books of John Lawton – The "Troy" series (accessed 19 February 2011)
John Lawton and the English past (accessed 19 February 2011)

20th-century British novelists
21st-century British novelists
Living people
1949 births
British male novelists
20th-century British male writers
21st-century British male writers